William Anthony Nugent, 13th Earl of Westmeath (born 21 November 1928) is an Anglo-Irish peer and a former soldier and schoolmaster.

The son of Gilbert Charles Nugent, 12th Earl of Westmeath, and his wife Doris Imlach, Nugent was born at Flowerhill House, Tynagh, County Galway, and educated at Marlborough College, Wiltshire, and at Royal Military College, Sandhurst. From there he was commissioned into the Royal Artillery and retired in 1961 with the rank of Captain. He was subsequently employed as a schoolmaster at St Andrew's School, Pangbourne, from 1961 to 1988.

He succeeded to his father's titles on the latter's death in 1971. In 1963, he married Susanna Margaret Leonard of Sutton Courtenay, Berkshire, a daughter of James C. B. W. Leonard, a Circuit court judge, and they had two sons:

 Sean Charles Weston Nugent, Lord Delvin born 16 February 1965
 Hon. Patrick Mark Leonard Nugent, born 6 April 1966

References

External links
 http://www.thepeerage.com/p48657.htm#i486564

1928 births
People from County Galway
People from Pangbourne
Royal Artillery officers
Irish expatriates in the United Kingdom
Living people
Graduates of the Royal Military College, Sandhurst
People educated at Marlborough College
Earls of Westmeath